Scrancia is a genus of moths in the family of Notodontidae erected by William Jacob Holland in 1893. The species are known from the Afrotropics.

Species
Some species of this genus are:
Scrancia amata Fawcett, 1916
Scrancia accipiter (Schaus & Clements, 1893)
Scrancia africana Aurivillius
Scrancia albidorsa Gaede, 1930
Scrancia albiplaga (Gaede, 1928)
Scrancia aesalon Kiriakoff, 1967
Scrancia agrostes Kiriakoff, 1962
Scrancia angustissima Kiriakoff, 1962
Scrancia astur Kiriakoff, 1962
Scrancia arcuata Kiriakoff, 1962
Scrancia argyrochroa Kiriakoff, 1962
Scrancia atribasalis Kiriakoff, 1967
Scrancia atrifasciata Gaede, 1928
Scrancia atrifrons Hampson, 1910
Scrancia accipites (Schaus, 1893)
Scrancia brunnescens Gaede, 1928
Scrancia buteo Kiriakoff, 1968
Scrancia cadoreli Viette, 1972
Scrancia corticalis Kiriakoff, 1965
Scrancia cupreitincta Kiriakoff, 1962
Scrancia danieli Kiriakoff, 1962
Scrancia discomma Jordan, 1916
Scrancia dryotriorchis Kiriakoff, 1968
Scrancia elanus Kiriakoff, 1971
Scrancia erythrops Kiriakoff, 1962
Scrancia expleta Kiriakoff, 1962
Scrancia discomma Jordan, 1916
Scrancia galactopera Kiriakoff, 1962
Scrancia galactoperoides Kiriakoff, 1970
Scranciola habilis Kiriakoff, 1965
Scrancia hypotriorchis Kiriakoff, 1967
Scrancia ioptila (Viette, 1955)
Scrancia lactea Gaede, 1928
Scrancia leucosparsa Kiriakoff, 1964
Scrancia leucopera Hampson, 1910
Scrancia margaritacea Gaede, 1928
Scrancia melierax Kiriakoff, 1965
Scrancia milvus Kiriakoff, 1971
Scrancia modesta Holland, 1893
Scrancia nisus Kiriakoff, 1967
Scrancia oculata Kiriakoff, 1962
Scrancia osica Kiriakoff, 1967
Scrancia paucinotata Kiriakoff, 1962
Scrancia piperita Kiriakoff, 1962
Scrancia polyphemus Kiriakoff, 1962
Scrancia prothoracalis Strand, 1911
Scrancia pyralina Kiriakoff, 1964
Scrancia quinquelineata Kiriakoff, 1965
Scrancia rothschildi Kiriakoff, 1965
Scrancia rachitica Kiriakoff, 1962
Scrancia sagittata Gaede, 1928
Scrancia stictica Hampson, 1910
Scrancia subrosea Gaede, 1928
Scrancia subscrancia Kiriakoff, 1970
Scrancia tephraea (Bethune-Baker, 1911)
Scrancia tinnunculus Kiriakoff, 1967
Scrancia tridens Kiriakoff, 1963
Scrancia tuleara Kiriakoff, 1963
Scrancia vaga Kiriakoff, 1962
Scrancia viridis Gaede, 1928

References

Notodontidae